Brenton D. Babcock (1830–1906) was the 29th mayor of Cleveland. As a Democrat, he was elected in 1886, serving from 1887 to 1888.

Early life
Babcock was born on October 2, 1830, in Adams, New York, to William and Elvira Babcock.

Career
Babcock became a clerk for the Erie Railroad in 1855, in Buffalo, New York. In 1865, he moved to Cleveland, working for Cross, Payne & Co, a coal dealership.

Politics
Babcock was the Democratic Party's nominee for the mayor of Cleveland in 1886. He defeated the Republican nominee Wm. M. Bayne to win election to a two-year term, serving from 1887 to 1888.

Personal life and death
Babcock was a Mason who was elected high priest of the Ohio lodge in 1898. He died suddenly of apoplexy in January 1906, which some of his peers ascribed to a stock market downturn. In his memory, the local Masonic lodge was renamed the Brenton D. Babcock F. & A. M. Lodge.

References

Mayors of Cleveland
1830 births
1906 deaths
People from Adams, New York